Abdygany Radzhapov Central Stadium is a football stadium in Kara-Suu, Kyrgyzstan.  It is the home stadium of Jashtyk-Ak-Altyn of the Kyrgyzstan League.  The stadium holds 5,000 spectators.

External links
Stadium information

Football venues in Kyrgyzstan